Eyvind J. Andersen (7 July 1874 – 2 January 1939) was a Norwegian judge.

He was born in Halden to Victor Christian Andersen and Theodora Caroline Jacobine Frølich. He graduated as cand.jur. in 1899, and was named as a Supreme Court Justice from 1921.

References

1874 births
1939 deaths
People from Halden
Supreme Court of Norway justices